This is a list of teams and players who have won the Dr Harty Cup since its inception in 1918.

By year

References

External links
 Complete Roll of Honour on Kilkenny GAA bible

Hurling cup competitions in Munster